Heparosan-N-sulfate-glucuronate 5-epimerase (heparosan epimerase, heparosan-N-sulfate-D-glucuronosyl 5-epimerase, C-5 uronosyl epimerase, polyglucuronate epimerase, D-glucuronyl C-5 epimerase, poly[(1,4)-beta-D-glucuronosyl-(1,4)-N-sulfo-alpha-D-glucosaminyl] glucurono-5-epimerase) is an enzyme with systematic name poly((1->4)-beta-D-glucuronosyl-(1->4)-N-sulfo-alpha-D-glucosaminyl) glucurono-5-epimerase. This enzyme catalyses the following chemical reaction

 heparosan-N-sulfate D-glucuronate  heparosan-N-sulfate L-iduronate

This enzyme acts on D-glucuronosyl residues adjacent to sulfated D-glucosamine units in the heparin precursor.

See also 
 heparan sulfate

References

External links 
 

EC 5.1.3